Guantánamo: America's War on Human Rights is a 2004 book by British investigative journalist and author David Rose.

Synopsis
The book examines the detention of prisoners at the military prison in American-occupied Guantánamo Bay, Cuba. The author visits the camp and speaks to guards, officials and medical staff as well as released prisoners. The book reveals serious violations of human rights, including physical brutality, isolation and harassment.

Reception
In The New Zealand Herald John Freeman reviewed the book positively, writing 'Rose does a good job of making this faraway legal black hole come to life.' Amnesty International listed the book as a useful resource.

References

2004 non-fiction books
Books about foreign relations of the United States
Books about counterterrorism
Books critical of conservatism in the United States
Books on anti-terrorism policy of the United States
English-language books
Faber and Faber books
Iraq War books
War on Terror books
Guantanamo Bay Naval Base